The Inner Circle of Advocates is an organization of civil plaintiff trial lawyers in the United States. To qualify for an invitation, members must have won a physical injury or death case with a million-dollar verdict. The group only admitted male members until 1990, when Judith Livingston became the first female member.

The group was conceived and founded by Richard Grand in 1972. Membership is limited to 100 lawyers at any one time.

References

External links
Official website

Legal organizations based in the United States